XHPAMM-FM is a radio station on 91.3 FM in Amatepec, State of Mexico. It is owned by Guillermina Casique Vences, a former federal deputy.

History
XHPAMM was awarded in the IFT-4 radio auction of 2017 and came to air in September 2018.

References

External links

Radio stations in the State of Mexico
Radio stations established in 2018
2018 establishments in Mexico